Alan David Smith (born 7 December 1966) is an English former footballer who made 31 appearances in Football League playing as a defender for Darlington in the 1980s. He was on the books of Sheffield Wednesday, but never represented them in the League, and went on to play non-league football for South Bank.

References

External links
 Player profile at inthemadcrowd.co.uk

1966 births
Living people
Footballers from Sheffield
English footballers
Association football defenders
Sheffield Wednesday F.C. players
Darlington F.C. players
South Bank F.C. players
English Football League players